John George Baillie-Hamilton, 13th Earl of Haddington (21 December 1941 – 5 July 2016), was a British peer and politician of the Conservative Party. He was also a photographer and explorer of the paranormal.

Baillie-Hamilton was born in December 1941, the son of George Baillie-Hamilton, 12th Earl of Haddington, and his wife Sarah née Cook (died 1995), born the younger of two children. He was the only son. He attended Ampleforth College, Trinity College, Dublin, and the Royal Agricultural College.
He worked as a photographer and published the magazine The Bird Table. He also worked with the Lebanese Tourist Board and the Centre for Crop Circle Studies. In 1998, he founded the charitable organization Save Our Songbirds, now Songbird Survival.

After his father's death in 1986, Baillie-Hamilton inherited the title of Earl of Haddington, aged 44 years. Thus, he acquired the then associated seat in the House of Lords. This he lost due to the House of Lords Act 1999. He applied for an elected seat, but only came 91st place on his party list. Of these 42 seats were awarded.

Baillie-Hamilton lived on the estate of Mellerstain House in Berwickshire.

On 19 April 1975, Baillie-Hamilton married Prudence Elizabeth Hayles. They divorced in 1981. He married again on 2 December 1984 to Jane Heyworth. The marriage produced three children, two daughters and a son:
George Edmund Baldred Baillie-Hamilton (b. 1985), who is now the 14th Earl of Haddington 
Lady Susan Moyra Baillie-Hamilton (b. 1988)
Lady Isobel Joan Baillie-Hamilton (b. 1990)

References

1941 births
2016 deaths
13
People educated at Ampleforth College
Alumni of Trinity College Dublin
Alumni of the Royal Agricultural University
John
Haddington